Motorrad is a 2017 Brazilian thriller film directed by Vicente Amorim. It was screened in the Contemporary World Cinema section at the 2017 Toronto International Film Festival. The film had concept art of by Brazilian comic artist Danilo Beyruth.

Cast
 Carla Salle as Paula
 Pablo Sanábio as Tomás
 Juliana Lohmann as Bia
 Emílio de Mello as Ricardo
 Guilherme Prates as Hugo

References

External links
 

2017 films
2017 thriller films
Brazilian thriller films
2010s Portuguese-language films